Kabua the Great, also Kabua Laplap, (died 4 July 1910) was iroijlaplap (paramount chief) of the Ralik Chain of the Marshall Islands. Known to the German traders for his leadership ability and reputation for bravery, Iroijlaplap Kabua was often eulogized by the German officials for his support of German trade and as an adherent of the German ways.

Family 
He was son of Jiba and he was father of Iroijlaplap Laelan and Jeimata Kabua.

References

Marshallese chiefs
1910 deaths